Tu și eu may refer to:

"Tu și eu", Romanian language version of "Crazy Sexy Wild" (2012) by Inna 
"Tu și eu", 2017 song by Carla's Dreams and Inna